Srour is a surname. Notable people with the surname include:

Ali Srour (born 1994), Lebanese-Norwegian boxer
Bashar Srour (born 1972), Syrian footballer
Heiny Srour (born 1945), Lebanese film director
Mohamed Srour (born 1986), Egyptian gymnast
Raul Henrique Srour (born 1961), Brazilian businessman 
Saad Hayel Srour (born 1947), Jordanian politician